is a railway station on the Keisei Kanamachi Line in Katsushika, Tokyo, Japan, operated by the private railway operator Keisei Electric Railway. The station is located adjacent to Kanamachi Station on the Joban Line operated by JR East.

Lines
Keisei Kanamachi Station is the terminus of the 2.5 km Keisei Kanamachi Line from Keisei Takasago.

Station layout
Keisei Kanamachi Station is a terminus with a single platform serving one track.

History
The Station opened on 21 October 1913, initially named Kanamachi Station. The station was renamed Keisei Kanamachi Station on 18 November 1931.

Station numbering was introduced to all Keisei Line stations on 17 June 2010. Keisei Kanamachi was assigned station number KS51.

Surrounding area
 Kanamachi Station (Joban Line)
 Mizumoto Park
 Edogawa River
 National Route 6

See also
 List of railway stations in Japan

References

External links

 Keisei station information 

Railway stations in Japan opened in 1913
Railway stations in Tokyo
Stations of Keisei Electric Railway